Chichester and Harbour Independents (CHI) is a political party based in Chichester, England. CHI was founded in 2021 and currently holds two seats on Chichester District Council. Both councillors were elected as Conservatives at the last district election but resigned to sit as independents on 28 September 2020. The Leader of CHI is Louise Goldsmith, a former Conservative leader of West Sussex County Council who stood down from the council at the last county election.

CHI was launched in October 2021. The party describes itself as an "independent voice" for residents of Chichester and the harbour villages.

Political positions 
The party has outlined eight political positions on which it stands:

 A halt on new housebuilding in the area.
 Ensuring voices in the community are heard through greater engagement.
 Improvements to the environment.
 Careful management of taxpayers money.
 Protection of our rich local heritage.
 Effective adequate sewage and drainage systems.
 A permanent solution to the chaos on the A27.
 Better road, walking and cycle infrastructure.

Election results

West Sussex County Council

References

External links 
 Official website
 Registration with the Electoral Commission

Political parties established in 2021
Locally based political parties in England
Organisations based in West Sussex
Politics of West Sussex
Chichester
2021 establishments in England